The Higher Education Research Data Collection (HERDC) is the annual collection of research income data from Australian universities.  It is currently collected by the Department of Education, Skills and Employment. HERDC data is used in the calculation of research block grants. 

It was originally called the Higher Education Financial and Research Publications Data Collection.

Higher Education Funding Act 1988 section 18 outlined the data that must be reported by institutions.

Purpose
HERDC data is used to allocate funding under the following programs:
 Research Support Program (RTP)
 Research Training Program (RTP)

The HERDC Specifications control the collection of higher education research data and are designed to ensure the Australian Government's research block grants are allocated in a fair and transparent way and to support the policy intent of the funding. The HERDC Specifications are updated annually in consultation with universities and other relevant stakeholders.

Categories
HERDC data is collected where it fits within the definitions provided for four categories:
 Australian Competitive Grants
 Other Public Sector Research Income
 Industry and Other Research Income
 Cooperative Research Centre (CRC) Research Income

See also
 Excellence in Research for Australia

References

External links
 
 2004 collection specifications
 Herdc The Metadata Issues, Metadata Advisory Committee for Australian Repositories 
 Recommendations On Herdc, Metadata Advisory Committee for Australian Repositories

Universities in Australia
Research in Australia